Pandemonium is a 1982 American parody slasher film. It was directed by Alfred Sole and features an ensemble cast including 
Tom Smothers, Eileen Brennan, Phil Hartman, Tab Hunter, Carol Kane, David Lander, Eve Arden, and  Paul Reubens.

The film went into production under the working title of Thursday the 12th. The film was the last feature in which Eve Arden appeared and also the last feature film Sole directed in his career.

Plot
In the fictional town of It Had To Be, Indiana, fullback Blue Grange scores the winning touchdown for It Had To Be University in the 1963 National Championship game. Afterwards, a shunned cheerleader named Bambi is seen fawning over Grange's locker before the on-field celebration pours into the locker room. As a group of cheerleaders are cleaning up the field after the game, all five are skewered with a javelin thrown by an unknown assailant. The bizarre murder makes headlines, as does a subsequent murder involving exploding pompons. As a result, the college's summer cheerleading camp is closed down. In 1982, the camp reopens with Bambi as the instructor. After arriving on campus, she meets Pepe the maintenance man and his mother Salt. Both warn her against reopening the camp as they believe it to be cursed with death, but Bambi is undeterred.

At a bus station, a young woman named Candy (labeled Victim #1) prepares to board a bus to the cheerleading camp but her religious fanatic mother tries to dissuade her. As they quarrel, red beams of light suddenly streak from Candy's eyes and levitate her mother into the air. As she hangs suspended, Candy tells her that she just wants to be normal and marches away to catch the bus. In another part of town, a male cheerleader named Glenn Dandy (Victim #2) says goodbye to his eccentric family before leaving for camp. Next, Mandy (Victim #3) is introduced by her father in a beauty pageant-style interview, revealing her obsession with dental hygiene. Sandy (Victim #4) asks for directions to the camp at a food truck and decides to hitchhike, but insists on getting references from every driver she passes (eventually accepting a ride with then-U.S. President Ronald Reagan). Andy and Randy (Victims #5 and #6 respectively), two lecherous male cheerleaders, are shown smoking marijuana while driving to the camp. The cheerleaders assemble at the camp and are greeted by Bambi.

Meanwhile, a Mountie named Sgt. Reginald Cooper makes a phone call to Warden June to express his concerns about the new cheerleading camp. He also learns of an escaped convict named Jarrett who murdered his entire family with a hand drill and turned them into bookshelves. Cooper then leaves the station in the care of his ill-tempered assistant Johnson to visit the Indiana State Asylum, where he inquires about another recent escapee named Fletcher, who is shown hitching a ride to the college with Jarrett.

The cheerleaders begin training, unaware that they are being stalked by a mysterious figure on campus. Cooper then arrives to meet the cheerleaders and quickly falls in love with Candy, singing a duet with her. Inspired, Glenn dresses in a tuxedo and attempts to woo Mandy, but fails to catch her during a routine practice drill and she injures her ankle. Bambi calls off practice for the day, but while the others go out to eat, a guilty Glenn stays in the gym to continue practicing and is killed when the mysterious figure rigs the trampoline with dynamite. While recovering in her dorm room, Mandy is brushing her teeth with copious amounts of toothpaste when the mystery man bursts through her medicine cabinet and kills her with a hand drill.

Back at the police station, Cooper receives a call from Warden June who tells him that Jarrett has been spotted at a cemetery and museum called Lover's Lane. He and Johnson leave to investigate and find the wrecked car Fletcher was driving, and meet Dr. Fuller from the asylum who is looking for Fletcher. Alerted by a scream inside the museum, Cooper and Johnson interrupt Jarrett before he can murder Fletcher. They are shocked to discover that Jarrett and Dr. Fuller are working together in a scheme to create and sell furniture made from their victims' bodies, but both deny harming any cheerleaders. Suddenly, Fletcher rises up and drives a butcher knife into Jarrett's mechanical arm, electrocuting both of them and Dr. Fuller.

Nevertheless, the slayings continue on campus. Bambi is enjoying a bath of milk and cookies when the killer reappears and drowns her. After a game of strip poker, Randy, Andy, and Sandy are killed in succession, and a panicked Candy discovers all the bodies before being stalked by the killer herself. She flees into the locker room where the killer reveals himself as Blue Grange, who secretly wanted to be a cheerleader instead of a football star and began murdering cheerleaders out of angst. Candy escapes onto the football field and uses her eye beams to run down Grange with a giant statue of himself, killing him. Cooper arrives to sweep Candy onto his horse named Bob and they happily ride off the field together.

Cast
Tom Smothers as Cooper
 Carol Kane as Candy
 Paul Reubens as Johnson
 Eve Arden as the Warden
 Candice Azzara as Bambi (as Candy Azzara)
 Eileen Brennan as Candy's Mom
 Judge Reinhold as Glenn-Dandy
 Kaye Ballard as Glenn's Mom
 Donald O'Connor as Glenn's Dad
 Tab Hunter as Blue Grange
 David L. Lander as Pepe
 Phil Hartman as the Reporter
 Debralee Scott as Sandy
 Marc McClure as Randy
 Teri Landrum as Mandy

Reception
The film earned mostly negative reviews and performed poorly at the box office.

Stephen Hill at HorrorNews wrote: "An hour and seventeen minutes has never felt so long... Pandemonium feels as though someone who had their sense of humour surgically removed is attempting to ape a Mel Brooks movie by going through all the motions."

A 1990's description of the film in the Canadian edition of TV Guide referenced Tom Smothers' role as a Mountie, adding the commentary, "we should sue".

See also 
List of American films of 1982

References

External links 

1982 films
1980s comedy horror films
American comedy horror films
American parody films
Metro-Goldwyn-Mayer films
United Artists films
Royal Canadian Mounted Police in fiction
Parodies of horror
1982 comedy films
Films set in Indiana
1980s English-language films
1980s American films